James II (c. 1438/1439 or c. 1440 – 10 July 1473) was the penultimate King of Cyprus (usurper), reigning from 1463 until his death.

Archbishop of Nicosia
James was born in Nicosia as the illegitimate son of John II of Cyprus and Marietta de Patras. He was a great favourite of his father, and in 1456, at the age of 16, he was appointed to the archbishopric of Nicosia. After murdering Iacopo Urri, the royal chamberlain, on 1 April 1457, he was deprived of the archbishopric and fled to Rhodes on a ship of the Catalan Juan Tafures. He was pardoned by his father, and the archbishopric was returned to him.

King of Cyprus
In 1458, his father died and his half-sister Charlotte became Queen of Cyprus. Then in 1460, with support from the Egyptian Mamluk sultan Sayf ad-Din Inal, James challenged her right to the throne, blockading her and her husband, Louis of Savoy, in the castle of Kyrenia for three years. When Charlotte fled to Rome in 1463, James was crowned king in her stead. In gratitude, he made his friend and supporter Juan Tafures Master of his Household and titular Count of Tripoli.

Marriage, death and succession
In Venice, on 30 July 1468, seeking political support, he married a 14-year-old Venetian, Catherine Cornaro, by proxy. She finally sailed to Cyprus in 1472 and married in person at Famagusta in October or November. James died in Famagusta a few months later amidst some suspicion that he might have been poisoned by agents of Venice, possibly by Catherine's uncles. According to his will, Catherine, who was pregnant, became regent. The couple's son, James III, died under suspicious circumstances in 1474 before his first birthday, leaving Catherine as queen regnant of Cyprus. During her reign, the island was controlled by Venetian merchants. In 1489, Venice forced her to abdicate, and Cyprus became a colony of the Republic of Venice.

Illegitimate children
Prior to his marriage, King James II had three natural children

 with an unnamed mistress:
 Eugene of Lusignan (b. c. 1468 - d. Venice, 1536), married Donna Paola Mazzara of Sicily after 1509.
Janus of Lusignan (d. after 1552), married (1) 1504 to N de Toro, married (2) 1547 to Virginia Cosanza dei Duchi di San Sava, with issue.
Charlotte of Lusignan (b. April 1468 - d. 24 July 1480 in Castel of Padua), she was either married or engaged to the designated heir of her aunt, Alonso, batard d'Aragona (1460–1510), a son of Ferdinand I of Naples. She was imprisoned by Queen Charlottte's opponents and died in captivity shortly before her twelfth birthday. 
He had another mistress, by the name of Eschive de Nores (d. after 1468), who married his cousin, Philippe, Titular Prince of Galilee, a natural son of his great-uncle, Henry. However, there is no record of any children with her.

Notes

References

Sources

Kings of Cyprus
15th-century monarchs in Europe
15th-century births
1473 deaths
15th-century Roman Catholic archbishops in Cyprus
Claimant Kings of Jerusalem
Burials at Saint Nicholas Cathedral, Famagusta
People from Nicosia
Archbishops of Nicosia